Language teaching, like other educational activities, may employ specialized vocabulary and word use. This list is a glossary for English language learning and teaching using the communicative approach.

Glossary

A

B

C

D

F

G

I

K

L

M

N

O

P

R

S

T

U

V

W

See also 

 Language education
 CALL  
 Monolingual learners' dictionaries  
 English language 
 Grammar 
 Language
 Learning by teaching
 Learning by teaching in German 
 Linguistics 
 Second language 
 Second language acquisition 
 Common European Framework of Reference for Languages
 American Council on the Teaching of Foreign Languages 
 English language learning and teaching 
 UNIcert

References 

 Peter McKenzie-Brown, Reflections on Communicative Language Teaching: A Course Book for Teaching English as a Second Language;copyrighted August 2012; .

Language education
Language teaching terms
Wikipedia glossaries using description lists